Copa is a genus of corinnid sac spiders first described by Eugène Simon in 1886.

Species
 it contains seven species in Asia, Africa, and Australia:
Copa annulata Simon, 1896 – Sri Lanka
Copa auroplumosa Strand, 1907 – Madagascar
Copa flavoplumosa Simon, 1886 (type) – West, Central, East, South Africa
Copa kabana Raven, 2015 – Australia (Queensland, New South Wales)
Copa kei Haddad, 2013 – South Africa
Copa lineata Simon, 1903 – Madagascar
Copa spinosa Simon, 1896 – Sri Lanka

References

Araneomorphae genera
Corinnidae
Taxa named by Eugène Simon